Danny Vitiello (born March 6, 1996) is an American soccer player who plays as an goalkeeper for USL Championship club Sacramento Republic.

Career

College and amateur
After redshirting in his freshman season in 2014, Vitiello went on to play four years of college soccer at the University at Albany, SUNY between 2015 and 2018. Vitiello completed his collegiate career at Albany making 60 appearances, claiming a 0.98 goals-against average, and a .784 save percentage with 24 clean sheets.

Whilst at college, Vitiello appeared in the USL PDL with Westchester Flames, Jersey Express and Long Island Rough Riders.

Professional
On January 8, 2019, Vitiello joined USL Championship side Nashville SC. On September 1, 2019, Vitiello made a short-term loan to appear on the bench for fellow USL Championship side New Mexico United against Orange County SC. He left Nashville at the end of the season ahead of the team joining MLS.

Vitiello signed with USL Championship club Pittsburgh Riverhounds on February 25, 2020. He made his professional debut on August 19, 2020, starting against Loudoun United in a 2–0 win. Following his shutout against Loudoun and a 2–2 draw with Saint Louis FC, Vitiello was named to the USL Championship Team of the Week.

On December 21, 2021, it was announced that Vitiello had joined Sacramento Republic ahead of their 2022 season.

References

External links

1996 births
Living people
Albany Great Danes men's soccer players
American soccer players
Association football goalkeepers
Jersey Express S.C. players
Long Island Rough Riders players
Nashville SC (2018–19) players
New Mexico United players
Pittsburgh Riverhounds SC players
People from Massapequa, New York
Sacramento Republic FC players
Soccer players from New York (state)
USL Championship players
USL League Two players
Westchester Flames players